The Consulate General of South Korea in Hong Kong is a consular mission of the Republic of Korea (ROK) to Hong Kong and Macau. It is located at 5-6F, Far East Finance Center 16, Harcourt Road, Admiralty, Hong Kong. It is one of the first South Korean overseas missions since the country's foundation, opened in British Hong Kong under approval of the United Kingdom in 1949, going through promotion and expansion in its history. Following the Transfer of sovereignty over Hong Kong to China in 1997, the Consulate General was able to keep its presence according to a Sino-Korean agreement concerning foreign missions stationed in Hong Kong.

History

The foundation of the Korean consular mission in Hong Kong has a background of the country's external trade. With the trade between Korea and Hong Kong started in 1947 and the establishment of Anglo-Korean diplomatic relations in 1949, progress was gained on setting up a consulate. On 8 February 1949, a letter from the British Government was sent to South Korea's Ministry of Foreign Affairs (MOFA) with approval on the Consulate. Cha Kyun-chan, then Director of the MOFA's Investigation Bureau, was appointed as the first Consul to Hong Kong, and went to his post by plane on 9 April. The Consulate was opened on 1 May, making it one of South Korea's first five missions abroad since the establishment of ROK Government.

On 29 November of the same year, the Consulate was promoted to the status of Consulate General, with 	Lee Jung-bang, councillor of the Korean Embassy to the Republic of China (ROC) became the first Consul General under appointment of the Korean MOFA. The Consulate General had its consular jurisdiction over both Hong Kong and Macau, and was relocated to several locations during the British colonial era, including Room 833-835, Man Yee Building, 67-71 Queen's Road, Room 2107-9, Realty Building. 71 Des Voeux Road and Korea Center Building, 3/F, 119-121, Connaught Road.

In 1980s, hotline between the Korean Consulate General and the Chinese Xinhua News Agency's Hong Kong Branch became an important communication channel between Seoul and Beijing following the hijacking of CAAC Flight 296 in 1983 and the desertion of Chinese Navy's Torpedo Boat 3213 to Korea in 1985. Also in 1985, in response to its contact to China on the field of economics, South Korea expanded the Consulate General on the mission's organization, function and the scale of diplomatic corps assigned to it, helping Korean companies and nationals in Hong Kong to trade with China. Korean diplomats with higher level was also assigned to Hong Kong as mission chiefs. Later in 1997, South Korea made consultation with China concerning the existence of the Korean Consulate General in Hong Kong, which was about to be transferred to China by the UK. On 15 April, resolution on the maintenance of Consulate General was made by the State Council of South Korea, and the two countries reached an agreement on 24 April, allowing the Consulate General to keep its presence in Hong Kong, the new Special administrative regions of China.

On 6 October 2009, the Korean Consulate General celebrated the 60th anniversary of its establishment, and a banquet was hosted to enhance the globalization of Korean cuisine. On 30 June of the same year, vacant space inside the Consulate General's auditorium and Consular Section was used to set up a new Cultural Center with exhibition sites and several kinds of IT equipment for cultural exchange. It was in February 2014 that the Consulate General opened its Korea Reference Room, which had a collection of 500 books in Korean, Chinese, English and 250 pieces of DVDs, containing resources like humanities, history, literature and publicity-related information issued by the Korean Government.

Heads of mission

See also

List of diplomatic missions of South Korea
Consular missions in Hong Kong
Koreans in Hong Kong
Korean International School of Hong Kong

References 

Hong Kong
Korea, Republic of

Admiralty, Hong Kong